Piarinagar is a census town in Kalna I CD Block in Kalna subdivision of Purba Bardhaman district in the Indian state of West Bengal.

Geography

Location

Piarinagar is also shown in the map of Kalna I CD block in the District Census Handbook.

Urbanisation
87.00% of the population of Kalna subdivision live in the rural areas. Only 13.00% of the population live in the urban areas. The map alongside presents some of the notable locations in the subdivision. All places marked in the map are linked in the larger full screen map.

Demographics
As per the 2011 Census of India, Piarinagar had a total population of 3,678 of which 1,917 (52%) were males and 1,761 (48%) were females. Population below 6 years was 345. The total number of literates in Piarinagar was 2,867 (86.02% of the population over 6 years).

Infrastructure
As per the District Census Handbook 2011, Piarinagar covered an area of 2.5518 km2. It had 4 km roads. Amongst the medical facilities, the nearest nursing home was 2 km away and the nearest veterinary hospital was 1 km away. It had 2 primary schools. Major educational facilities were available 7 km away at Kalna.

References

Cities and towns in Purba Bardhaman district